Wushu was contested by both men and women at the 1994 Asian Games in Aki Ward Sports Center, Hiroshima, Japan from October 12 to October 14, 1994. It was competed in the disciplines of Taolu with six events, Taijiquan, Nanquan and Changquan for both genders. Changquan event consisted of Changquan, one long weapon discipline and one short weapon discipline.

Schedule

Medalists

Men

Women

Medal table

Participating nations
A total of 79 athletes from 15 nations competed in wushu at the 1994 Asian Games:

References 
 New Straits Times, October 12–15, 1994
 Results
 Results

External links 
 Olympic Council of Asia

 
1994 Asian Games events
1994
Asian Games
1994 Asian Games